is a 60-meter-high (197 ft) lattice tower located in Forest Park at Sanbu, Chiba, Japan. Built in 1998, the tower represents the Sanbu Japanese cedar tree. It includes an observation deck located at  that provides visitors with a 360-degree view of the surrounding landscape.

References

Tourist attractions in Chiba Prefecture
Buildings and structures in Chiba Prefecture
Observation towers in Japan
Towers completed in 1998
1998 establishments in Japan
Sanmu